"Let Me Go" (labelled as "Let Me Go!" on the sleeve of the single) is a single by Heaven 17, a band consisting of a few member of Human League, taken from (and released several months before) their second album The Luxury Gap.    It reached #41 on the UK Singles Chart, the lowest chart placement among the singles from that album but their highest at the time of the single's release.

In 1983, the song also spent five weeks at #4 on the American dance chart and entered the US Billboard Hot 100.

About the song
Allmusic cites the song as "a club hit that features Glenn Gregory's moody, dramatic lead above a percolating vocal and synth arrangement."

Band member Martyn Ware has acknowledged Let Me Go as Heaven 17's finest song: "Melodically its beautiful" and “There’s a certain sonata form to it as well where it builds and then it dies down towards the end. You end with the same chord as the first chord. It feels like an integrated piece of art to me.”

The song was recorded at AIR Studios, London and the band were using studio technology as a musical tool. For example, the opening vocal of the song consists of 118 multi-tracked voices singing in 14-part harmony.

It was one of the first commercial releases to feature the Roland TB-303, a bass synthesiser which later played a pivotal role in the later acid house movement.

Legacy
The song appeared at #81 on Q101 Top 500 Songs of "All Time".

Formats
7" Single
"Let Me Go" – 4:19
"Let Me Go" (Instrumental) – 4:59

12" Single
"Let Me Go" (Extended Version) – 6:14
"Let Me Go" (Instrumental) – 4:54

Appearances in popular culture
 It was the first track heard on the opening episode of That 80's Show.
 The distinctive bassline and drum machine is sampled on "Ce Jeu", a track by French band Yelle, released in September 2007.

Chart performance

References

1982 singles
Heaven 17 songs
Songs written by Martyn Ware
Songs written by Glenn Gregory
Songs written by Ian Craig Marsh
Music videos directed by Steve Barron
1982 songs
Virgin Records singles